"Country Shit" is a song by rapper Big K.R.I.T. The remix features rappers Ludacris and Bun B. The song was released as the lead single off Big K.R.I.T.'s mixtape "Krit Wuz Here". "Country Shit" charted on Billboard charts after the remix was released.

Remix

The official remix of the song features rappers Ludacris and Bun B. The remix was released to iTunes on May 17, 2011 and to radio on May 30, 2011.

Music video 
On June 11, 2011 the music video for the remix featuring Texas rapper Bun B and Georgia rapper  Ludacris was released. The music video features a cameo appearance by Chamillionaire. The music video was shot in Mississippi; Atlanta, Georgia, and Port Arthur, Texas.

Track listing
 Digital single

 Remix Digital single

Charts

Certifications

Release information

Purchasable Release

References

2010 songs
2010 singles
Big K.R.I.T. songs
Ludacris songs
Bun B songs
Songs written by Big K.R.I.T.
Song recordings produced by Big K.R.I.T.
Songs written by Kenny Gamble
Songs written by Leon Huff
Songs written by Ludacris
Songs written by Bun B